Lista plinthochroa is a species of moth of the family Pyralidae. It was described by W. West in 1931 and is known from the Philippines.

References

Moths described in 1931
Epipaschiinae